"X" is the first single from Xzibit's third studio album, Restless. Fellow West Coast rapper Snoop Dogg can be heard talking in the outro. It was produced by Dr. Dre with co-production from Scott Storch and Melvin "Mel-Man" Bradford. The song samples the line "Not these niggas again" from Eminem's "Bitch Please II" which is featured on Eminem's album The Marshall Mathers LP. The single was released through Epic Records, SRC Records, Loud Records, and Xzibit's Open Bar Entertainment.

Music video

The music video directed by Dave Meyers has cameo appearances from Snoop Dogg, Dr. Dre, RZA and Method Man. In the first verse, Xzibit raps his verse in a limo with women around. In the second verse, Xzibit is at a party, then in a bathroom when three men come in and try to attack Xzibit, only for Xzibit to teleport to the backstage area of his concert via a device. Most of the video includes Xzibit in a studio with Snoop and Dr. Dre rapping and in the third verse he is in a concert performing while the cameo appearance rappers are sitting with the fans.

Track list
"X" (Radio Edit) - 4:22
"X" (Explicit) - 4:16
"X" (Instrumental) - 4:22

Chart performance
This song charted number 76 at Billboard Hot 100 and number 32 at Hot R&B songs. But #14 at the UK Charts has remained as Xzibit's second highest chart at UK as the highest chart is "Hey Now (Mean Muggin)" released in 2004.

Charts

Weekly charts

Year-end charts

References

2000 singles
Xzibit songs
Snoop Dogg songs
Dr. Dre songs
2000 songs
Songs written by Xzibit
Song recordings produced by Dr. Dre
Song recordings produced by Scott Storch
Loud Records singles